Zubovka is the name of several rural localities in Russia.

Modern localities
Zubovka, Astrakhan Oblast, a selo in Zubovka Selsoviet of Chernoyarsky District of Astrakhan Oblast
Zubovka, Republic of Bashkortostan, a village in Muzyakovsky Selsoviet of Krasnokamsky District of the Republic of Bashkortostan
Zubovka, Bryansk Oblast, a village in Ryabchovsky Selsoviet of Navlinsky District of Bryansk Oblast
Zubovka, Novosibirsk Oblast, a selo in Tatarsky District of Novosibirsk Oblast
Zubovka, Perm Krai, a village in Ilyinsky District of Perm Krai
Zubovka, Samara Oblast, a selo in Chelno-Vershinsky District of Samara Oblast
Zubovka, Saratov Oblast, a village in Atkarsky District of Saratov Oblast
Zubovka, Tula Oblast, a village in Zubovsky Rural Okrug of Kimovsky District of Tula Oblast
Zubovka, Tver Oblast, a village in Grishinskoye Rural Settlement of Oleninsky District of Tver Oblast

Historical localities
Zubovka, Murmansk Oblast, an inhabited locality under the administrative jurisdiction of the urban-type settlement of Pechenga in Pechengsky District of Murmansk Oblast; abolished in December 2009